The Miss West Virginia competition is the pageant that selects the representative for the U.S. state of West Virginia in the Miss America Pageant.

In the fall of 2018, the Miss America Organization terminated the Miss West Virginia organization's license as well as licenses from Florida, Georgia, New Jersey, New York, Pennsylvania, and Tennessee.

The Miss America Organization reinstated the license to Shelley Nichols-Franklin of Martinsburg who was the former Executive Director of Miss Berkeley County (WV) between 2000 and 2019.

With Alaska became the latest state crowned the Miss America title, West Virgnia is one of the few states along with Maine, South Dakota and Wyoming that has yet to win a Miss America, Miss USA, or Miss Teen USA title.

Elizabeth Lynch of Martinsburg was crowned Miss West Virginia 2022 on June 25, 2022 at the Airborne Event Center in Martinsburg, West Virginia. She competed for the title of Miss America 2023 at the Mohegan Sun in Uncasville, Connecticut in December 2022 where she placed 3rd runner-up.

Results summary
The following is a visual summary of the past results of Miss West Virginia titleholders at the national Miss America pageants/competitions. The year in parentheses indicates the year of the national competition during which a placement and/or award was garnered, not the year attached to the contestant's state title.

Placements
 2nd runners-up: Ella Dee Kessel (1965)
 3rd runners-up: Elizabeth Lynch (2023)
 Top 10: Deborah Davis (1980), Danae DeMasi (2002)
 Top 15: Lillian Ward (1927), Juanita Park Wright (1940), Joan Elizabeth Estep (1947), Phyllis Walker (1952), Chelsea Malone (2016)
 Top 16: Norma Lee Salisbury (1946)
 Top 18: Mildred Fetty (1933)

Awards

Preliminary awards
 Preliminary Evening Gown: Danae DeMasi (2002)
 Preliminary Lifestyle and Fitness: Ella Dee Kessel (1965), Cynthia Sims (1994)

Non-finalist awards
 Non-finalist Interview: Leah Lasker (1992)
 Non-finalist Talent: Karen Childers (1964), Lois Gay Ratcliff (1966), Judith Shoup (1970), Mary Derry (1975), Patricia Paugh (1978), Kari Safford (1997), Paige Madden (2015)

Other awards
 Duke of Edinburgh Silver Award: Morgan Breeden (2016)
 Fruit of the Loom Award: Melissa Costello (1991)

Winners

References

External links
 Official website

West Virginia
West Virginia culture
Women in West Virginia
1922 establishments in West Virginia
Annual events in West Virginia
Recurring events established in 1922